Panruti is a legislative assembly in Cuddalore district, which includes the city, Panruti. It is a part of the Cuddalore Lok Sabha constituency. This constituency is notable for Mr. Panruti Ramachandran or Panruttiar, who was elected to this constituency 6 times, under 3 different parties, DMK, AIADMK and PMK. Elections were not held in the years 1957 and 1962. It is one of the 234 State Legislative Assembly Constituencies in Tamil Nadu, in India.

Madras State

Tamil Nadu

Election Results

2021

2016

2011

2006

2001

1996

1991

1989

1984

1980

1977

1971

1967

1952

References 

 

Assembly constituencies of Tamil Nadu
Cuddalore district